"Believe Me" is a song by American hip hop musician Fort Minor, the side project of rock band Linkin Park's lead vocalist Mike Shinoda. It was the third US and first international single from Fort Minor's debut album, The Rising Tied (2005), and was released on November 14, 2005. The track features hip hop group Styles of Beyond and Eric Bobo of Cypress Hill.

Background
"Believe Me" is one of two songs in The Rising Tied (other than "Red to Black") where Mike Shinoda also sings (besides rapping), specifically the chorus. The main melody of the song is from Apple Inc.'s GarageBand loops named "Orchestra Strings 08." In the end of the album version song, it is heard that Mike Shinoda says, "Okay, so here's the thing", and segues into "Get Me Gone".

Music video
The official music video was directed by Lauren Briet. The video simply shows Fort Minor in a parking garage, which is illuminated by lights that expand to one side. The chorus is presented with more exchanging lights in the shape of Mike Shinoda's head. Also, in the very last second of the video clip it is possible to see somebody (appears to be Tak) possibly tripping over or dancing just after the colored light passes Ryu. In the start of the video the water drops which fall on the ground synchronize with the beginning piano tune. DJ Cheapshot of Styles of Beyond and Eric Bobo also appear in the video, although none of them play any instruments.

The music video is available on the Fort Minor Militia DVD.

Track listings

Charts

Weekly charts

Year-end charts

Release history

References

2005 songs
2005 singles
Fort Minor songs
Songs written by Mike Shinoda
Warner Records singles